Tony Rüegg is a Swiss bobsledder who competed in the early 1980s. He won two bronze medals in the four-man event at the FIBT World Championships, earning them in 1981 and 1982.

He is the brother of Max Ruegg, the father of Ralph Rüegg, and the uncle of Reto and Ivo Rüegg, all of whom have competed in bobsleigh.

References
Bobsleigh four-man world championship medalists since 1930

Living people
Swiss male bobsledders
Year of birth missing (living people)
20th-century Swiss people